Checchin is an Italian surname. Notable people with the surname include:

Luca Checchin (born 1997), Italian footballer
Stefano Checchin (born 1967), Italian road cyclist

See also
Carlo Checchinato (born 1970), Italian rugby union player and manager

Italian-language surnames